Semenovskoye is a rural locality (a village) in Vysokovskoye Rural Settlement, Ust-Kubinsky  District, Vologda Oblast, Russia. The population was 2 as of 2002.

Geography 
The distance to Ustye is 15 km, to Vysokoye is 6 km. Makaryino is the nearest rural locality.

References 

Rural localities in Ust-Kubinsky District